Charchelu (also Romanized as Charchīlū) is a village in Yaft Rural District, Moradlu District, Meshgin Shahr County, Ardabil Province, Iran. At the 2006 census, its population was 271, in 57 families.

References 

Towns and villages in Meshgin Shahr County